The 1930–31 Divizia A was the nineteenth season of Divizia A, the top-level football league of Romania.

Participating teams

Final Tournament of Regions

Preliminary round

Semifinals

Final
June 28, 1931, Reșița

Champion squad

References

Liga I seasons
Romania
1930–31 in Romanian football